Polish Blood (German: Polenblut) is a 1934 musical film directed by Carl Lamac and starring Anny Ondra, Hans Moser and Iván Petrovich. It is an operetta film, based on a work by the Polish-born writer Leo Stein. The film's sets were designed by art directors Bohumil Hes and Stepán Kopecký. A separate Czech language version was also released.

Cast
 Anny Ondra as Helena Zaremba  
 Hans Moser as Jan Zaremba  
 Iván Petrovich as Graf Bolko Baransky  
 Margarete Kupfer as Jadwiga Kwasinskaja 
 Hilde Hildebrand as Wanda Kwasinskaja  
 Rudolf Carl as Bronio von Popiel  
 Paul Rehkopf as Dymscha, Gutsverwalter  
 Karl Platen as Constanty 
 Helmut Heyne   
 Franz Marner   
 Alfred Frey

References

Bibliography 
 Bock, Hans-Michael & Bergfelder, Tim. The Concise CineGraph. Encyclopedia of German Cinema. Berghahn Books, 2009.

External links 
 

1934 films
1934 musical films
German musical films
Austrian musical films
Czech musical films
1930s German-language films
Films directed by Karel Lamač
Films set in Poland
Operetta films
Films based on operettas
Czechoslovak multilingual films
German multilingual films
Austrian multilingual films
Films based on works by Aleksandr Pushkin
German black-and-white films
Austrian black-and-white films
1934 multilingual films
1930s German films